The Yedigöze Dam, also known as Sani Bey Dam, is a concrete-face rock-fill dam on the Seyhan River bordering İmamoğlu and Aladağ districts in Adana Province, Turkey. The primary purpose of the dam is hydroelectric power generation and irrigation. The dam's power station has an installed capacity of 320 MW and the reservoir will help irrigate . Construction began in 2007 and the river was diverted by 2008. In the same year construction on the actual dam began and the reservoir began to fill on 15 June 2010. By November 2010 the remaining construction work was complete and the generators were commissioned in 2011. Construction on the irrigation works is ongoing.

See also

Kavşak Bendi Dam – upstream
Çatalan Dam – downstream

References

Dams in Adana Province
Concrete-face rock-fill dams
Dams completed in 2010
Hydroelectric power stations in Turkey
Dams on the Seyhan River